The Miller Brothers Cotton Warehouse is a historic cotton warehouse at 705 Gervais St. in Columbia, South Carolina.  It is a low-profile single-story brick building, set at an angle to the street, in a city district historically occupied by many similar buildings.  Built in 1872, its orientation is due to the presence of railroad tracks (no longer extant) on either side of the parcel.  Its first major owners were the Miller Brothers, dealers in cotton; it has been used to house foodstuffs and electrical equipment in its long history of use.

The building was added to the National Register of Historic Places in 2016.

See also
National Register of Historic Places listings in Columbia, South Carolina

References

Industrial buildings and structures on the National Register of Historic Places in South Carolina
Industrial buildings completed in 1872
National Register of Historic Places in Columbia, South Carolina
Warehouses on the National Register of Historic Places
Cotton industry in the United States
History of the textile industry in the United States
1872 establishments in South Carolina